 

Mexico has 872 separately licensed television stations authorized by the Federal Telecommunications Institute.

Commercial stations are primarily operated by Televisa, TV Azteca, Grupo Imagen, Grupo Multimedios and their affiliate partners. There are seven major national commercial channels, two of which are almost exclusively available over-the-air as subchannels:

Azteca Uno (103 total stations)
Las Estrellas (129 total stations)
Imagen Televisión (42 transmitters)
Canal 5 (97 total stations)
Azteca 7 (103 total stations)
ADN 40
A Más

There are also local stations with independent programs, stations and subchannels carrying Televisa's Nu9ve network which commonly shares time with local programming, and Televisa Regional stations, which incorporate programming from various Televisa networks alongside local news and magazine programs. Multimedios Televisión operates a regional network concentrated in northeastern Mexico, and a handful of independent stations operate primarily in regions along the border.

Noncommercial stations are divided into public and social concessions. Public concessions are predominantly owned by federal and state governments and public institutions of higher education. The two largest public networks are Canal Once, owned by the Instituto Politécnico Nacional, and the multiplexed transmitter network of the Sistema Público de Radiodifusión del Estado Mexicano (SPR), which offers multiple public television services. 27 of the 32 states also operate their own state networks, some of which have dozens of low-power transmitters. Social concessions are held by private universities, civil associations, and some individuals.

In addition, due to Mexico's rugged terrain, many stations operate low-powered, mostly co-channel translators (legally known as equipos complementarios de zona de sombra) to serve areas shielded by terrain, to improve signal reception in fringe areas, or (in some cases) to serve completely different television markets. Translators may be in different states from their parent stations; a handful even operate as local stations in their own right with their own local programs.

The list demonstrates the legacy of large television station concessions awarded in the 1980s and early 1990s. The two most notable of these were awarded to Televisa; the 1982 concession of 95 television stations in small communities is responsible for the bulk of the Canal de las Estrellas network, while the concession of 62 stations to Radiotelevisora de México Norte, a subsidiary of Televisa, was awarded in the early 1990s and expanded the Canal 5 and Gala TV networks. Since the conversion to digital, Televisa and Azteca have multiplexed transmitters in rural areas, bringing full national network service to smaller communities for the first time.

In March 2015, Grupo Imagen (under the name Cadena Tres I, S.A. de C.V.) and Grupo Radio Centro won concessions for 123 new television stations each, forming two new national television networks. The new networks must meet a minimum coverage standard set by the IFT for 2018 and reach full national coverage by 2020. However, Grupo Radio Centro refused to pay its winning bid of 3.058 billion pesos and thus had its concession revoked. Imagen's network, Imagen Televisión, launched on October 17, 2016, with a presence in nearly every state.

Analog stations were shut off beginning on July 18, 2013, with a pilot transition in Tijuana. In 2015, stations went digital-only throughout the country on 10 dates. Some 129 analog television stations owned by noncommercial entities, such as state governments, and another 368 repeaters of primarily Televisa stations, received exemptions to delay their transition until December 31, 2016.

Virtual channels were assigned by the IFT in 2016, unifying most transmitters of national networks under one number and ending decades of old analog channel numbers. In some cases, local stations were required to find new virtual channels.

Aguascalientes

Baja California

Baja California Sur

Campeche

Chiapas

Chihuahua

Coahuila

Colima

Mexico City

Durango

Guanajuato

Guerrero

Hidalgo

Jalisco

State of Mexico

Michoacán

Morelos

Nayarit

Nuevo León

Oaxaca

Puebla

Querétaro

Quintana Roo

San Luis Potosí

Sinaloa

Sonora

Tabasco

Tamaulipas

Tlaxcala

Veracruz

Yucatán

Zacatecas

See also 
 List of Mexican television networks
 Television in Mexico

Notes

References